Mark Brewer is an American lawyer, political consultant, and a member of the Democratic National Committee. He is the former chair of the Michigan Democratic Party and a past chair of the Association of State Democratic Chairs.

Professional work 
In 2013, Brewer lost his bid for a tenth two-year term as MDP Chair to Lon Johnson, a former political operative and former candidate for the Michigan House of Representatives. Brewer withdrew form the election during the February 23, 2013 Michigan Democratic Party Convention held at Cobo Hall in Detroit, Michigan. In June 2013, Mark joined Goodman Acker, the Detroit area firm, as a lawyer and political consultant.

He graduated from Harvard University in 1983.

References

External links 
 Biography
 

Living people
People from Macomb County, Michigan
Michigan lawyers
Michigan Democrats
Michigan Democratic Party chairs
2008 Democratic National Convention
Year of birth missing (living people)
Place of birth missing (living people)
Harvard University alumni